Oeax is a genus of longhorn beetles of the subfamily Lamiinae. 

 Oeax albosignatus Breuning, 1952
 Oeax collaris Jordan, 1903
 Oeax griseus Breuning, 1951
 Oeax latefasciatus Breuning, 1978
 Oeax lateralis Jordan, 1903
 Oeax lichenea Duvivier, 1891
 Oeax marshalli Breuning, 1935
 Oeax obtusicollis Breuning, 1939
 Oeax paralateralis Breuning, 1977
 Oeax petriclaudii (Quentin & Villiers, 1981)
 Oeax pygmaeus (Kolbe, 1893)
 Oeax rufescens Breuning, 1939
 Oeax similis Breuning, 1986
 Oeax subaequalis Breuning, 1955
 Oeax transversus (Aurivillius, 1913)
 Oeax triangularis (White, 1858)
 Oeax tricuspis Báguena, 1952
 Oeax ugandae Breuning, 1971

References

Ancylonotini